The Houston Texans Cheerleaders are the official cheerleading squad of the Houston Texans of the National Football League. Although they are marketed as cheerleaders, they are actually a dance team. The group has been with the team since the team's inception in 2002. The squad's tryouts were held at the Methodist Training Center from 2002 to 2019. Since 2021, the squad hold auditions at the local gym called Texans Fit. The group currently has 35 members. Yearly, the squad releases a swimsuit calendar, having done so since 2008-2016. Currently they release as "sideline calendar" which features pictures of the cheerleaders on their game day activities.

The squad also makes off-the-field appearances at charity events and parties. In 2011, the squad held a "Birds and Birdies" Golf Tournament at Cypresswood Golf Club. Also in 2011, the squad had a HTC All Stars Group, before a game against the Carolina Panthers, in which cheerleaders from across Houston got together to perform at the "Happy Holidays Show". The squad also act as mentors to young girls in the Houston area via the Junior Cheerleader program and are one of the major advocates in Houston for female empowerment.

Notable members
Ashley Clay (2007–2008), wife of Ryan Cochrane 
Cathy Hernandez (2007-2008), reporter for KPRC-TV
Courtney Lopez (2013), Miss Wisconsin USA 2010
Laurie Flynn, wife of Matt Schaub
Carrie Milbank, hostess of The Hockey Show on the NHL network
Casey Potter (2012-2014), current director/coach of the Houston Texans Cheerleaders
Lauren Leal (2013-2015), current host of the Houston Sports Show on KPRC-TV

Gallery

References

External links

 Houston Texans Cheerleaders official page
  Fast Life 100 Most Beautiful Cheerleaders
 Texans Twins Michelle & Rachel interview
 Texans Twins Dresdynn & Schuyler interview

Houston Texans
National Football League cheerleading squads
2002 establishments in Texas
Performing groups established in 2002
History of women in Texas